is a former Japanese football player and manager and who is current head coach WE League club of Omiya Ardija Ventus.

Playing career
Okamoto was born in Tokyo on December 8, 1967. After graduating from Kokushikan University, he played for NTT Kanto (later Omiya Ardija) as goalkeeper.

Coaching career
Since 1997, Okamoto became top team goalkeeper coach and youth team manager for Omiya Ardija. In May 2012, top team manager; Jun Suzuki was sacked. Okamoto managed team as caretaker. After that, Zdenko Verdenik was appointed new manager. But In August 2013 manager; Zdenko Verdenik was sacked. So, Okamoto managed team as caretaker again. After that, Tsutomu Ogura was appointed new manager.

References

External links

soccerway.com

1967 births
Living people
Kokushikan University alumni
Association football people from Tokyo
Japanese footballers
Omiya Ardija players
Japanese football managers
J1 League managers
Omiya Ardija managers
Association football goalkeepers